NCAA Division I conference realignment refers to changes in the alignment of college or university athletic programs from one National Collegiate Athletic Association athletic conference to another.

Announced future changes 

Notes
 The "year" column indicates the calendar year in which the conference change will take place, which in the case of spring sports will differ from the year in which competition will begin.

History

2022–2023

2021–2022

2020–2021

2019–2020 
Note
 Because of the COVID-19 pandemic, schools that made conference moves affecting only spring sports were unable to complete their first seasons in the new league, or in some cases to even play said seasons.

2018–2019

2017–2018

2016–2017

2015–2016

2014–2015

2013–2014 

Note
 On February 28, 2013, it was reported that the seven Catholic schools that had announced plans to leave the Big East Conference (collectively called the "Catholic 7") would do so in July 2013, two years ahead of the original schedule, and would keep the "Big East" name. On April 3, the football-sponsoring conference that retained the charter of the original Big East announced that it would be called the American Athletic Conference (AAC or The American). Accordingly, the following convention is being used in the 2013–14 table:
 Big East (1979–2013) — The conference as it existed before July 2013.
 Big East (2013) — The new conference formed by the "Catholic 7" schools.

2012–2013

2011–2012

2010–2011

See also 
 1996 NCAA conference realignment
 2005 NCAA conference realignment
 2010–2014 NCAA conference realignment
 2021–22 NCAA conference realignment

References 

 Realignment
College football controversies